The 1979 W.D. & H.O. Wills World Indoor Bowls Championship  was held at the Coatbridge indoor bowling club, North Lanarkshire, Scotland, from 10 to 14 January 1979.

The championship was a men's singles event in which David Bryant won his first title defeating Jim Donnelly 21-14 after a final that lasted 23 ends. The event was organised by the Monklands District Council with two round robin groups of five players. It was sponsored by W.D. & H.O. Wills.

Draw and results

Group stages

Section A
 David Bryant P4 W4
 Jim Donnelly P4 W3
 Errol Bungey P4 W2
 Tony Dunton P4 W1
 Bill Farrell P4 W0

Section B
 Gwyn Evans P4 W4
 Jim Blake P4 W2
 Eric Liddell P4 W2
 Bruce Matheson P4 W2
 George Alley P4 W0

Medal round

References

External links
Official website

World Indoor Bowls Championship
1979 in bowls